Kostanjevica Monastery is a Franciscan monastery in Pristava near Nova Gorica, Slovenia. The locals frequently refer to it simply as Kapela (meaning The Chapel in Slovene).

The monastery with the Church of the Annunciation of Our Lady stands on a 143-metre hill dividing the town of Nova Gorica and the suburb of Pristava. It is located just some 200 meters from the border with Italy. It is famous as the burial place of Charles X of France and his family.

History 

In 1623 a small Carmelite sanctuary was erected just outside the limits of the town of Gorizia. In the next hundred years, a monastery was built next to the church, while the monastic chapel became an important site for pilgrims from Friuli and Goriška regions. In 1781, the monastery was disbanded by the Habsburg Emperor Joseph II. In 1811, the Franciscan friars acquired the abandoned complex, re-establishing the monastery. Among other, they brought a notable library containing some 10,000 books, which they transferred from the nearby Sveta Gora monastery. Today, the library is named after Father Stanislav Škrabec, a renowned Slovene linguist from the 19th century who lived and worked in the monastery for more than 40 years.

The Kostanjevica monastery was severely damaged in the Battles of the Isonzo during World War I. It was restored between 1924 and 1929. Until the end of World War II, the monastery was part of the town of Gorizia. In 1947, the border between Italy and Yugoslavia was set just a few hundred meters westward from the monastery, and Kostanjevica became part of the newly established town of Nova Gorica.

The crypt 
In the 19th century, the crypt of the Franciscan monastery was used for the burial of members of the French House of Bourbon who went into exile after the July Revolution. Most of them had settled in Gorizia, then part of the Austrian Empire, in the 1830s. Those buried in the crypt are:

References 

 Kostanjevica Monastery Official Site

External links 

Franciscan Monastery of Kostanjevica - Nova Gorica, Slovenia
 Slovenia info
 Flickr image

Franciscan monasteries in Slovenia
Christian monasteries in the Slovene Littoral
Christian monasteries in Slovenia
Burial sites of the House of Habsburg-Lorraine
Burial sites of French royal families
Burial sites of the House of Bourbon